Solmsen is a family name and may refer to:

 (1865–1911), German linguist
Friedrich Solmsen (1904–1989), German classical scholar

See also
 Solmssen (disambiguation)